Harmologa pontifica is a species of moth of the family Tortricidae. It is found in New Zealand.

The wingspan is about 21 mm. The forewings are greyish with ashy-purplish reflections, sprinkled with dark fuscous and some whitish scales. The costal fold is dark fuscous. The hindwings are grey, but darker posteriorly.

References

Moths described in 1911
Archipini